is a private junior college in Kunitachi, Tokyo, Japan. It is one of the 149 junior colleges in Japan set up in 1950 when the junior college system started. It consists of two departments.

Departments
 Department of health and physical education
 Department of Infant Education

See also 
 List of junior colleges in Japan
 Tokyo Women's College of Physical Education

External links
 Official website

Private universities and colleges in Japan
Japanese junior colleges
Universities and colleges in Tokyo